Hieracium maculatum, the spotted hawkweed, is a flowering plant species in the genus Hieracium found in Europe. It has been introduced in North America and is considered a weed in Canada.

See also 
 List of the vascular plants of Britain and Ireland 7

References

External links 

maculatum
Flora of Europe